Chalee Tennison (born April 11, 1969) is an American country music artist from the state of Texas. She has released three major-label studio albums (two on Asylum Records and one on Dreamworks Records) in addition to charting six singles on the Billboard Hot Country Singles & Tracks (now Hot Country Songs) charts. Her highest charting singles, "Just Because She Lives There" and "Go Back", both reached No. 36 on that chart.

Biography
Chalee Tennison was born in Texas and was influenced musically by her brother's collection of 8-track tapes, which included artists such as Tammy Wynette and Tanya Tucker. She sang in church choir with her mother and sister, but did not begin singing professionally until she was 16. She then started a band with her third husband, which performed in Gatesville, Texas. To support herself at the time, she also worked a variety of jobs, including waitress, substitute teacher, and prison security guard.

She moved to Nashville, Tennessee and worked as a demo singer. After record producer Jerry Taylor discovered her demos, he helped her sign to Asylum Records in 1999. Her first, self-titled album was issued that year, with "Someone Else's Turn to Cry" as the lead single. Following it were "Handful of Water" and "Just Because She Lives There", which became her first Top 40 entry on the Billboard Hot Country Songs charts, peaking at No. 36. At the time of the album's release, Tennison had been divorced three times, and was a single mother of three children, of which an uncredited review in Radio & Records stated that "Chalee Tennison sounds like she truly understands the songs she sings. maybe it's because she's lived them." Tennison told the same publication that "I feel very lucky as a new artist that I got to cut the kind of record I wanted to cut. It's very different, as far as the music itself, but it's all me." She supported the album by touring in 1999 with Alan Jackson.

Her second Asylum album was titled This Woman's Heart. Produced by Jerry Taylor, it included two more chart singles: "Makin' Up with You" and "Go Back", which also charted at No. 36. A review of "Makin' Up with You" in Billboard praised Tennison's voice but criticized the song's central message of "looking to start a fight and encouraging her man to slam doors because she loves the way he looks when he tries to be tough." The same publication published a favorable review of "Go Back", calling it " a stirring ballad that updates a long- favored tradition in country music -the trucker song." while also praising Tennison's voice and the song's melody.

In 2002, she moved to DreamWorks Records and recorded her Parading in the Rain album on that label. "Lonesome Road", the lead single to the album, charted late in the year, reaching No. 54. Another single titled "Easy Lovin' You", which featured guest vocals from her daughter Tiffany, was issued in April 2003.

Discography

Albums

Singles

Guest singles

Music videos

References

1969 births
American women country singers
American country singer-songwriters
Living people
Asylum Records artists
DreamWorks Records artists
21st-century American women